Ahmadabad Rural District is in the Central District of Nazarabad County, Alborz province, Iran. At the census of 2006, its population was 5,792 in 1,477 households, and in the most recent census of 2016, it had increased to 6,053 in 1,877 households. The largest of its 22 villages was Ahmadabad-e Mosaddeq, with 1,603 people.

References 

Nazarabad County

Rural Districts of Alborz Province

Populated places in Alborz Province

Populated places in Nazarabad County